George Ponsonby O'Callaghan, 2nd Viscount Lismore (16 March 1815 – 29 October 1898) was an Irish peer and British Army officer.

He was the third and only surviving son of Cornelius O'Callaghan, 1st Viscount Lismore and  Lady Eleanor Butler, daughter of John Butler, 17th Earl of Ormonde. 

He commissioned into the 17th Lancers and served with the regiment in the Crimean War. He held the office of High Sheriff of Tipperary in 1853. On 30 May 1857 he succeeded to his father's titles and assumed his seat in the House of Lords. He also succeeded his father as Lord Lieutenant of Tipperary and held the position until 1885.

He married Mary Norbury, daughter of George Norbury of Fulmer, Buckinghamshire, on 25 July 1839, and together they had two sons:
 George O'Callaghan (1846-1885) who married Rosina Williams in Ambala, India, but died without issue.
 William O'Callaghan (1852-1877) who served as MP for Tipperary. He died unmarried and without issue.

Both sons predeceased Lord Lismore, leaving no heir, and his titles became extinct upon his death.

The Lismores had a home in Ireland at Shanbally Castle and also in Mayfair, London. They lived at 34 Grosvenor Street from 1863-1867, then at 31 Old Burlington Street from 1867 until the death of Lady Lismore in 1900.

References

1815 births
1898 deaths
17th Lancers officers
British Army personnel of the Crimean War
Lord-Lieutenants of Tipperary
George
Viscounts in the Peerage of Ireland